Kim Jun-young (born 31 May 1999) is a South Korean professional footballer who most recently played for Dinamo Minsk.

References

External links 
 
 

1999 births
Living people
South Korean footballers
Association football midfielders
South Korean expatriate footballers
Expatriate footballers in Belarus
FC Dinamo Minsk players
Footballers from Seoul
South Korean expatriate sportspeople in Belarus